Inahi no Mikoto (741-681 BC according to traditional dating) was a Japanese legendary character. In Japanese traditional mythology, he was a brother of Emperor Jimmu, the first Emperor who according to tradition lived in the 7th century BC. According to the Kojiki, he became a King over part of Korea.

References 

Japanese mythology
Mythological characters